The River States Conference (RSC), formerly known as the Kentucky Intercollegiate Athletic Conference (KIAC), is a college athletic conference affiliated with the National Association of Intercollegiate Athletics (NAIA). Although it was historically a Kentucky-only conference, it has now expanded to include members in Indiana, Ohio, Pennsylvania, and West Virginia, and at various times in the past has also had members in Missouri, Tennessee, and Virginia.

History

In March 2016, the KIAC announced it would change its name to the River States Conference, effective July 1, 2016, to better reflect its membership, which has expanded beyond Kentucky and now includes members in Pennsylvania, Indiana, Ohio, and West Virginia.

Chronological timeline
 1916 - The River States Conference was founded as the Kentucky Intercollegiate Athletic Conference (KIAC). Charter members included Berea College, Centre College, Georgetown College, Kentucky Wesleyan College, the University of Louisville, Ogden College, Transylvania University, and Western Kentucky State Teachers College (now Western Kentucky University) beginning the 1916-17 academic year.
 1927 - Ogden left the KIAC as the school announced that it would merge with Western Kentucky after the 1926-27 academic year.
 1927 - Eastern Kentucky State Teachers College (now Eastern Kentucky University) joined the KIAC in the 1927-28 academic year.
 1931 - Morehead State Teachers College (now Morehead State University) joined the KIAC in the 1931-32 academic year.
 1933 - Murray State Teachers College (now Murray State University) and Union College joined the KIAC in the 1933-34 academic year.
 1948 - Eastern Kentucky, Louisville, Morehead State, Murray State, and Western Kentucky left the KIAC to join the University Division ranks of the National Collegiate Athletic Association (NCAA) and to form most of the charter members of the Ohio Valley Conference (OVC) after the 1947-48 academic year.
 1951 - Bellarmine College (now Bellarmine University) joined the KIAC in the 1951-52 academic year.
 1955 - Kentucky Wesleyan left the KIAC after the 1954-55 academic year.
 1955 - Thomas More College (now Thomas More University) joined the KIAC in the 1955-56 academic year.
 1958 - Pikeville College (now the University of Pikeville) joined the KIAC in the 1958-59 academic year.
 1962 - Centre (Ky.) left the KIAC to join the College Athletic Conference after the 1961-62 academic year.
 1964 - Bellarmine left the KIAC after the 1963-64 academic year.
 1964 - Campbellsville College (now Campbellsville University) and Rio Grande College (now the University of Rio Grande) joined the KIAC in the 1964-65 academic year.
 1968 - Oakland City College (now Oakland City University) joined the KIAC in the 1968-69 academic year.
 1971 - Rio Grande left the KIAC to join the Mid-Ohio Conference (later known as the American Mideast Conference) after the 1970-71 academic year.
 1971 - Asbury College (now Asbury University) and Clinch Valley College of the University of Virginia (now the University of Virginia's College at Wise or UVa Wise) joined the KIAC in the 1971-72 academic year.
 1975 - Oakland City left the KIAC after the 1974-75 academic year.
 1983 - Alice Lloyd College joined the KIAC in the 1983-84 academic year.
 1984 - Brescia College (now Brescia University) and Lindsey Wilson College joined the KIAC in the 1984-85 academic year.
 1991 - Thomas More left the KIAC to join the NCAA Division III ranks as an independent after the 1990-91 academic year.
 1991 - Midway College (now Midway University) joined the KIAC in the 1991-92 academic year.
 1992 - Alice Lloyd left the KIAC to join the Tennessee Valley Athletic Conference (TVAC) after the 1991-92 academic year.
 1992 - Spalding University joined the KIAC in the 1992-93 academic year.
 1994 - UVa Wise left the KIAC to become an independent within the NAIA (which would later join the Tennessee-Virginia Athletic Conference (TVAC) beginning the 1995-96 academic year) after the 1993-94 academic year.
 1994 - Indiana University–Southeast joined the KIAC in the 1994-95 academic year.
 1995 - Campbellsville, Georgetown (Ky.), and Union (Ky.) left the KIAC to form part as charter members of the Mid-South Conference after the 1994-95 academic year.
 1999 - Bethel College of Tennessee (now Bethel University of Tennessee) joined the KIAC in the 1999-2000 academic year.
 2000 - Lindsay Wilson and Pikeville left the KIAC to join the Mid-South after the 1963-64 academic year.
 2000 - Mid-Continent University joined the KIAC in the 2000-01 academic year.
 2001 - Transylvania left the KIAC to join the NCAA Division III ranks and the Heartland Collegiate Athletic Conference (HCAC) after the 2000-01 academic year.
 2003 - The St. Louis College of Pharmacy (SLCP) joined the KIAC in the 2003-04 academic year.
 2005 - Alice Lloyd re-joined the KIAC in the 2005-06 academic year.
 2006 - Bethel (Tenn.) and Mid-Continent left the KIAC after the 2005-06 academic year.
 2007 - Spalding left the KIAC to join the NCAA Division III ranks and the St. Louis Intercollegiate Athletic Conference (SLIAC) after the 2006-07 academic year.
 2007 - Indiana University–East and Mountain State University joined the KIAC in the 2007-08 academic year.
 2008 - Cincinnati Christian University joined the KIAC in the 2008-09 academic year.
 2012 - Mountain State left the KIAC as the school announced that it would close after the 2011-12 academic year.
 2012 - Carlow University and Point Park University joined the KIAC in the 2012-13 academic year.
 2013 - Indiana University–Kokomo joined the KIAC in the 2013-14 academic year.
 2014 - Two institutions left the KIAC to join their respective new home primary conferences: Berea left the NAIA to join the NCAA Division III ranks as an independent (which would later join the USA South Athletic Conference (USA South) beginning the 2017-18 academic year), and UHSP St. Louis to join the American Midwest Conference, both effective after the 2013-14 academic year.
 2014 - Rio Grande re-joined the KIAC in the 2014-15 academic year.
 2015 - Ohio Christian University and West Virginia University Institute of Technology (WVU Tech or West Virginia Tech) joined the KIAC in the 2015-16 academic year.
 2016 - The KIAC has been rebranded as the River States Conference (RSC) in the 2016-17 academic year.
 2019 - Cincinnati Christian left the RSC as the school announced that it would close at the end of the fall 2019 semester during the 2019-20 academic year.
 2020 - Oakland City re-joined the RSC in the 2020-21 academic year.
 2021 - Asbury left the RSC and the NAIA to join the NCAA Division III ranks as an independent as well as the Division I ranks of the National Christian Collegiate Athletic Association (NCCAA) after the 2020-21 academic year.
 2021 - Ohio Valley University and Saint Mary-of-the-Woods College joined the RSC in the 2021-22 academic year.
 2021 - Ohio Valley left the RSC as the school announced that it would close at the end of the fall 2021 semester during the 2021-22 academic year.
 2022 - Carlow announced on July 6 that it will leave the RSC and the NAIA to join the NCAA Division III ranks and the Allegheny Mountain Collegiate Conference (AMCC) after the 2022-23 academic year, starting in the 2023–24 season.
 2022 - Indiana University–Purdue University Columbus (IUPUC) and Shawnee State University will join the RSC beginning the 2023-24 academic year.
 2023 - Ohio Christian will leave the RSC and the NAIA to fully align with the Division I ranks of the NCCAA after the 2023-24 academic year.

Member schools

Current members
The River States currently has 13 full members, all but four are private schools:

Notes

Future members

Notes

Former members
The River States had 27 former full members, all but four were private schools. School names and nicknames reflect those used in the final school year each institution was a conference member:

Notes

Membership timeline

Conference sports
The River States Conference currently sponsors 17 sports (8 men's and 9 women's).

References

External links